The 2020–21 Georgia Tech Yellow Jackets women's basketball team represented Georgia Institute of Technology during the 2020-21 NCAA Division I women's basketball season. They were led by second-year head coach Nell Fortner and played their home games at McCamish Pavilion as members of the Atlantic Coast Conference.

The Yellow Jackets finished the season 17–9 and 12–6 in ACC play to finish in third place. In the ACC tournament, they defeated to Clemson in the Quarterfinals before losing to eventual champions NC State in the Semifinals.  They received an at-large bid to the NCAA tournament where they were the five seed in the HemisFair Regional.  In the tournament they defeated twelve seed  in the First Round and four seed West Virginia before losing to one seed South Carolina in the Sweet Sixteen to end their season.

Previous season
They finished the 2019–20 season 20–11 and 10–8 in ACC play to finish in seventh place.  As the seventh seed in the ACC tournament, they defeated Pittsburgh in the Second Round before losing to eventual champion NC State in Quarterfinals.  The NCAA tournament and WNIT were cancelled due to the COVID-19 outbreak.

Off-season

Departures

Recruiting Class

Source:

Roster

Schedule
Source:

|-
!colspan=6 style=""| Regular Season

|-
!colspan=6 style=""| ACC Women's Tournament

|-
!colspan=6 style=";"| NCAA tournament

Rankings

See also
2020–21 Georgia Tech Yellow Jackets men's basketball team

References

Georgia Tech Yellow Jackets women's basketball seasons
Georgia Tech
2021 in sports in Georgia (U.S. state)
2020 in sports in Georgia (U.S. state)
Georgia Tech